Bonfol railway station is a railway station in the municipality of Bonfol, in the Swiss canton of Jura. It is the northern terminus of the standard gauge Porrentruy–Bonfol railway line of Chemins de fer du Jura. The line formerly continued across the French border to Pfetterhouse; passenger service ended 1946 and the line was abandoned in 1970.

History 
The station was renovated in 2022 as part of a larger rehabilitation of the Porrentruy–Bonfol railway line.

Services 
 the following services stop at Bonfol:

References

External links 
 
 

Railway stations in the canton of Jura
Chemins de fer du Jura stations